Limanda is a genus of righteye flounders native to the northern Atlantic and Pacific oceans.

A 2018 cladistic morphological and genetic analysis found that the genus is not monophyletic, and has proposed L. ferruginea, L. proboscidea and L. punctatissima be placed in the genus Myzopsetta.

Species
There are currently six recognized species in this genus:
 Limanda aspera (Pallas, 1814) (Yellowfin sole)
 Limanda ferruginea (D. H. Storer (fr), 1839) (Yellowtail flounder)
 Limanda limanda (Linnaeus, 1758) (Common dab)
 Limanda proboscidea C. H. Gilbert, 1896 (Longhead dab)
 Limanda punctatissima (Steindachner, 1879) (Speckled flounder)
 Limanda sakhalinensis C. L. Hubbs, 1915 (Sakhalin sole)

References 

 
Pleuronectidae
Marine fish genera
Taxa named by Carl Moritz Gottsche